Admiral International Films was an Italian film studio set in Rome and whose director was Mario Maggi. It produced Veinte pasos para la muerte (1970), by Manuel Esteba, and Aquel maldito día (1971).

Filmography
 La banda de los tres crisantemos (1970)
 Aquel maldito día (1970)
 Twenty Paces to Death (1970)
 Ore di terrore (1971)

References

Italian film studios
History of film
Defunct companies of Italy
Defunct film and television production companies